Benjamin Netanyahu
 Gilad Erdan
 Yuli Edelstein
 Yisrael Katz
 Miri Regev
 Silvan Shalom
 Moshe Ya'alon
 Ze'ev Elkin
 Danny Danon
 Yariv Levin
 Benny Begin 
 Tzachi Hanegbi
 Yuval Steinitz
 Gila Gamliel
 Ofir Akunis
 David Bitan 
 Haim Katz
 Jackie Levy 
 Yoav Kish
 Tzipi Hotovely
 Dudu Amsalem
 Miki Zohar
 Anat Berko
 Ayoob Kara
 Nava Boker
 Avi Dichter
 Avraham Nagosa
 Nurit Koren
 Yaron Mazuz
 Oren Hazan
 Sharren Haskel
 Amir Ohana
 Yehoshua Yehuda Glick
 Osnat Mark
 Ziv Agmon
 Pinhas Adin
 Michael Ratzon
 Shevach Stern
 Yigal Amir Whiteman
 Patin Molah
 Ayelet Galili
 Naftali Naor
 Hassan Hayav
 Ayala Shtagman
 Aryeh Netanel Lipo
 Shimon Israel
 Jackie Pinto
 Silva Mizrahi
 Gil Hadad
 Roni Stern
 Gadi Bashari
 Ori Prague
 Tali Argaman
 Yair Davidi
 Ariel Bochnik
 Michel Buscaglia
 Gavi Kadosh
 Shimon Shetrit
 Elad Zamir
 Haruah Mimon
 Chaim Zeev Friedrich
 Tzadok Cohen
 Mimon Toledano
 Yehezkel Eynai
 Silas Eliezer
 Sinai Kahat
 Issac Dikestein
 Refael Katshwili
 Refael Zanzuri
 Zion Pinyan
 Lior Haimovich
 Michael Lovovicob
 Avner Netanel
 Etamar Sonino
 Ido Elimelech Carmel
 Mordechai Avner
 Yaron Nissim
 David Elhyani
 Yair Revivo
 Benjamin Biton
 Arnon Abrahamov
 Eliezer Yehoshua Rodrig
 Tzur David Even
 Moshe "Bogi" Albert
 Yechezkel Yagnah
 Arnon Barzilai
 Meir Nissim Dahan
 Alon Moshe Sison
 Hir Navuani
 Gabriel Shwartz
 Oz Issac Alter
 David Samuel Hayim
 Japheth Tiri
 Susan Mader
 Natalia Yelinson
 Shoshana Savage
 Meir Halavi
 Tova Maoz
 Rephael Peretz
 Baruch Broker
 Hillel Brenman
 Chaim Tzvi Lipkin
 Dov Gilboa
 Raudor Vardimon
 Juliet Lasker
 Issac Hen
 Hadua Spiegel
 Chaya Shamir
 Tzvi David
 Shlema Tzwifir 
 Rafi Gargus
 Aharon Bozer
 Mahlof Banksus
 Oscar Frischer
 Izo Haimovich
 Dalia Eigler
 Kohava Matityahu
 Moshe "Bogi" Dolgin
 Yahadut Band
 Moshe Nissim

Notes

External links
Central Elections Committee Official Likud List

Lists of Israeli politicians
 
2015 in Israeli politics